Phaenon (Greek: Φαίνων) in Greek mythology is the sky god of Cronus(as in the planet Saturn). The name Phaenon is sometimes used poetically to refer to the planet Saturn; 'Phaenon' means 'bright' or 'shining', and Saturn is a bright planet which is easy to see.

See also
 List of Greek mythological figures

References

Greek gods
Sky and weather gods
Saturnian deities